The 2012–13 Tennessee Volunteers men's basketball team represented the University of Tennessee in the 2012–13 college basketball season. The team's head coach was Cuonzo Martin, who was in his second season at Tennessee. The team played their home games at the Thompson-Boling Arena in Knoxville, Tennessee as a member of the Southeastern Conference.

Previous season
The Volunteers posted a record of 19–15 (10-6 SEC) in the 2011–12 season and finished second in the SEC standings in Cuonzo Martin's first season as head coach.  The season was highlighted by a sweep of Florida and a victory over perennial power Connecticut. The Volunteers a streak of five consecutive NCAA Tournament appearances come to an end by appearing in the 2012 National Invitation Tournament.  The Volunteers lost in the first round of the NIT to Middle Tennessee State by a score of 64-71.

Roster

Schedule

|-
!colspan=12| Exhibition

|-
!colspan=12| Non-Conference Regular Season

|-
!colspan=12| SEC Regular Season

|-
!colspan=12| 2013 SEC tournament

|-
!colspan=12| 2013 NIT

|-
| colspan="12" | *Non-Conference Game. Rankings from AP poll. All times are in Eastern Time
|}

References

Tennessee
Tennessee Volunteers basketball seasons
Tennessee
Volunteers
Volunteers